André Ernotte (3 June 1943 – 8 March 1999) was a Belgian film director and screenwriter.

Filmography

References

External links

1943 births
1999 deaths
Belgian film directors
Belgian screenwriters
Film people from Liège
20th-century screenwriters